Duntally Wood is a national nature reserve of approximately  located in County Donegal, Ireland. It is managed by the Irish National Parks & Wildlife Service.

Features
Duntally Wood was legally protected as a national nature reserve by the Irish government in 1986. The reserve is also a candidate for a Special Area of Conservation.

The woodland includes ash, elm, hazel, holly, oak and downy birch, with an under planting of bluebells, bugle, early purple orchid, hard fern, meadowsweet, wild garlic and wood anemone. Among the birds found in the reserve are buzzards, jays, ravens, sparrowhawks, and tree-creepers. The site has a 2.5 km looped trail.

References

Geography of County Donegal
Forests and woodlands of the Republic of Ireland
Nature reserves in the Republic of Ireland
Tourist attractions in County Donegal